The 1939–40 season saw Rochdale begin to compete for their 19th season in the Football League Third Division North, however with the outbreak of World War 2, the league was abandoned, and a wartime league was formed. The F.A. Cup was also cancelled and replaced with the League War Cup.

Statistics
																				

|}

Competitions

Football League Third Division North

Regional League - North West Division

Jubilee Fund

War League Cup

Lancashire Cup

References

Rochdale A.F.C. seasons
Rochdale